The Crystal Palace and South London Junction Railway (CPSLJR) was built by the London, Chatham and Dover Railway (LCDR) from  to Crystal Palace High Level to serve the Crystal Palace after the building was moved to the area that became known as Crystal Palace (otherwise "Upper Norwood") from its original site in Hyde Park.

History

Origins
The Great Exhibition closed in 1851, leaving the Crystal Palace building in Hyde Park redundant.  Rather than simply being demolished, between 1852 and 1854 it was rebuilt in a pleasure park at Sydenham Hill as an "events" venue, creating a potential demand for lucrative leisure travel.

The London Brighton and South Coast Railway (LBSCR) was the first to exploit this by running a spur up from Sydenham to a new station next to the park, opening in 1854. In 1858 this was extended east via  to "Bromley" on the LCDR mainline, and in 1860 west to Victoria.

The WELCPR thus became the LCDR's principal route to central London, and provided good access to the new Crystal Palace site.  But it was operated by, and later leased to, the LBSCR, which inevitably led to operational friction.  The LCDR needed an independent mainline to the West End and City, and its own Crystal Palace station.  In 1863 it opened the new mainline from Beckenham Junction to Victoria via Brixton, with a branch to the City from Herne Hill.

The LCDR lines were extended east from Peckham as far as Nunhead then south to Upper Norwood under the auspices of the CPSLJR, an LCDR-promoted independent company. The branch and its terminus, the new  station, opened in 1865, 11 years after the re-siting of the Crystal Palace.

Operation

The branch line had a chequered history, linked to the Crystal Palace's own precarious financial position, with two periods of closure.  Wartime economies led to the line closing from 1917 to 1919.   After this first closure, trains from Holborn Viaduct railway station in the city were not reinstated. However, the branch was electrified, as part of a Southern Railway scheme, on 12 July 1925.  After electrification all trains operated to Blackfriars and Holborn Viaduct.

Following the destruction of the Crystal Palace by fire in 1936, the line lost most of its original function of carrying visitors to events in the Palace.   Manpower shortages led to a second closure from 1944 to 1946.
When services were reintroduced they were very lightly used, and the line finally closed on 20 September 1954.   The track was lifted in 1956.
The northern part remains in use as part of the former Greenwich Park branch line and the Catford Loop Line

Lordship Lane station was the subject of one of Camille Pissarro's small-scale pictures.

Although much of the route of the railway has now been lost to residential development, it can be traced in places. Architectural features remain such as the ornamental portal of the Paxton Tunnel just north of the terminus.  Part of the route adjacent to the Horniman Museum and Gardens is now a 'Railway Nature Trail', maintained for the museum by the Trust for Urban Ecology. The section between Cox's Walk footbridge and northern entrance to the Crescent Wood tunnel is managed by the London Wildlife Trust as the Sydenham Hill Wood nature reserve. Two tunnel entrances remain at Hillcrest Wood and are known hibernation roosts for the Brown long-eared bat.

In the early 1990s, a local amenity group, Friends of the Great North Wood, produced a walking leaflet entitled From the Nun's Head to the Screaming Alice describing a route that closely follows the line. ('Screaming Alice' was Cockney rhyming slang for Crystal Palace.) The walk continues from the site of Crystal Palace High Level past the Crystal Palace Museum to the remaining Crystal Palace railway station (formerly Crystal Palace Low Level).

Stations 
The original line served the following stations: 
 Denmark Hill
 Peckham Rye
 Nunhead
 Honor Oak (closed)
 Lordship Lane (closed)
 Upper Sydenham (closed)
 Crystal Palace High Level (closed)
Crystal Palace High Level was in competition with Crystal Palace Low Level station for passenger traffic to the Crystal Palace.

References

Further reading 
 
  Available for £1 plus postage from The London Wildlife Trust (Sydenham Hill Wood Project)

External links
 Pissarro's Lordship Lane station on Courtauld Institute, Art & Architecture site

Transport in the London Borough of Lewisham
Transport in the London Borough of Southwark
Transport in the London Borough of Lambeth
History of rail transport in London
Closed railway lines in London
Railway lines opened in 1865
Railway lines closed in 1954